Louisiana Highway 20 (LA 20) is a state highway that serves Terrebonne Parish, Lafourche Parish, and St. James Parish.

Route description
From the south, LA 20 begins at LA 182 in the northwest Terrebonne Parish town of Gibson.  The road parallels then intersects U.S. 90 (Future I-49) at two locations (Exits 189 & 194) as it heads northeastward, where it intersects LA 24 in Schriever.  LA 20 turns due north and intersects LA 1 in Thibodaux as it continues northward.  The road then passes through Chackbay before it enters St. James Parish.  LA 20 runs northward through South Vacherie and ends at an intersection with LA 18 in North Vacherie.

History
In 1972, LA 20 was routed off of Jackson Street in downtown Thibodaux and onto parallel Canal Boulevard, a four-lane, largely residential thoroughfare.  The extension of Canal Boulevard north of Bayou Lafourche was to be opened soon, bypassing St. Patrick Street.  The route change was opposed by Thibodaux's mayor, Warren Harang, and the Louisiana Department of Highways agreed to keep truck traffic routed via Jackson Street, which was retained as LA 20 Spur.  By the late 1990s, LA 20 was routed back onto Jackson Street, reinstating a short concurrency with LA 1 from St. Mary Street to West 1st Street and utilizing LA 308 to connect with North Canal Boulevard.

In Vacherie, LA 20 originally turned east along LA 18 and crossed the Mississippi River by ferry to Lutcher.  It then followed what is now LA 3274 to a terminus at US 61 (Airline Highway).  The ferry service was replaced by the newly opened Gramercy Bridge (or Veterans Memorial Bridge) in May 1995, and LA 20 was truncated to its present terminus in Vacherie two years later.

Major intersections

References

External links

La DOTD State, District, and Parish Maps
District 02
District 61
Terrebonne Parish (Northwest Section)
Terrebonne Parish (Northeast Section)
Lafourche Parish (Northwest Section)
St. James Parish

0020
Transportation in Terrebonne Parish, Louisiana
Transportation in Lafourche Parish, Louisiana
Transportation in St. James Parish, Louisiana